Armageddon Gospels is a 2019 British folk horror film written, produced and, directed by John Harrigan and produced by the British immersive theatre and production collective FoolishPeople. The film premiered at the 2018 Byline Fest and was released on the 31 October 2019.

Premise 

Refugee gods, transposed to flesh and blood, wash ashore to rouse the myths of ancient England, half-drowned in a forgotten past. They disperse through shifting realities to awaken the giant Albion and find the holy grail in a ritual to save England from the rot of darkness and hatred that's strangling its soul.

Cast 
Kate Alderton as Aradia
Milo Cradick as Cunning Murrell
Ethan-James Harrigan as Young Robin
Finn Harrigan as Robin
John Harrigan as Hare / Fisher King
Lucy Harrigan as Dianna
Tereza Kamenicka as Sophia
Sabrina Rodríguez as Epona
Victoria Karlsson as MT
Scott Temple as Percy
Claire Tregellas as Pearl
Laura Wolfe as May Queen / Betty

Reception

Martin Unsworth of Starburst Magazine awarded the film seven out of ten stars, writing, "Perhaps not as accessible as other folk horror tales, Armageddon Gospels is a worthy and well-made movie that rises above its humble budget and will no doubt develop a cult following with alternative groups."

Awards
Brighton Rocks Film Festival 2018, Best Director Award - John Harrigan 
First Hermetic International Film Festival 2019, Italy, Cagliostro Award - Best Storytelling

References

External links
 
 Daily Grail Review

2019 films
2019 independent films
2019 horror films
British black-and-white films
British horror films
British independent films
Crowdfunded films
Films about cults
Films about neopaganism
Films shot in England
Folk horror films
2010s English-language films
2010s British films